Cable cars in Haifa refers to two cable car systems in Haifa, Israel: the tourist-oriented Bat Galim cable car system that runs up Mount Carmel from the Bat Galim promenade in the western part of the city, and the Rakavlit – a public-transportation aerial tramway in the southeastern part of the city, which ascends from the Haifa Bay public transit hub to the hilly areas housing the University of Haifa and the Technion.

Bat Galim cable car
A tourist cable car runs up and down the mountain from the top of the Carmel, across from the Stella Maris Carmelite Monastery, to Bat Galim, with views of Haifa Bay and its surroundings. The cable car began operating in 1986. The route is 355 meters long.

Rakavlit - commuter service

The רכבלית/Rakavlit (a diminutive of רכבל, meaning cable car, and itself a contraction of רכבת, train, and כבל, cable), is a gondola lift that is a part of the city's expanded public transport system complementing the existing city bus and Metronit BRT lines. 

The cable car's route runs from the HaMifratz Central Bus Station and public transit hub at the foot of Mount Carmel to the Technion and then onto the University of Haifa, for a total distance of 4.4 kilometres and an elevation gain of 460m. Most of the passengers are expected to be students. Total travel time from the Check Post Junction to the University of Haifa was originally estimated at 17 minutes. More recent estimates, however, indicate that travel time will be 19 minutes.  

The cable car, which has six stations, was named through a competition open to schools in the Haifa municipality. A similar contest was held in 2010 to choose the name of Haifa's Metronit lines.

The Yefeh Nof municipal development company began work on the system in June 2017. Original estimates indicated that the project would cost an estimated 280 million NIS. It is part of a wider plan to address traffic congestion in Haifa, and in particular, on the two university campuses. It is anticipated that all discounts (such as student and senior rates) presently available on other transit systems will be available on the cable car, which will also be fully accessible to individuals with disabilities.

An anticipated 150 fully-accessible cable cars will each hold up to ten passengers, departing from the stations every 15 seconds. Total passenger capacity is estimated to be up to 2,400 passengers per hour in each direction. The journey from the Haifa Bay Central Station (Merkazit Hamifratz) to the Technion will take about 10 minutes, and another 9 minutes from the Technion to the University of Haifa.

Test runs began on the cable car line in April 2021, with a planned opening date of October 10, 2021. However, media reports the following day indicated that while all infrastructure was complete, a dispute had arisen with Doppelmayr Cable Car, the Austrian cable car manufacturer which was delaying the inauguration of the service. According to official statements from the Israeli Ministry of Transportation, the dispute was contractual in nature, while inside sources believed the dispute was financial in nature, with Doppelmayr demanding a further 20 million Euros in payment before they activate the system.

Doppelmayr also built the cars currently in use for Haifa's Carmelit underground funicular railway line, the shortest subway system in the world, with only four cars, six stations and a single tunnel 1.8 km (1.1 mi) long.

See also
 Carmelit
 Egged
 Metronit
 Transportation in Israel

References

External links
 

Transport in Haifa
Tourist attractions in Haifa
Aerial tramways in Israel